The ERCO IL-116 was an American inline aircraft engine designed and built in the late 1930s. The type was not placed into series production due to competition from cheaper engines.

Design and development
In late 1938, the Engineering and Research Corporation (ERCO) searched unsuccessfully for a suitable engine for its new "safe" airplane, the Ercoupe. ERCO hired Harold Morehouse, former engineer in charge of small engine design at Continental Motors, to design a new engine. He came up with the inverted, in-line IL-116, which provided good pilot visibility and enhanced aircraft streamlining.

ERCO installed the IL-116 in the prototype Ercoupe Model 310 in 1939. The engine performed well, but ERCO discontinued it when Continental introduced the Continental A65 engine in 1940, which generated comparable horsepower at half the cost. ERCO manufactured parts for six IL-116s but only three were built.

Engines on display
An ERCO IL-116, believed to be the last remaining engine, is on display at the National Air and Space Museum.

Specifications (IL-116)

See also

References

Notes

Air-cooled aircraft piston engines
1930s aircraft piston engines
Inverted aircraft piston engines